Bochum Welt is the stage name of the Italian electronic musician Gianluigi Di Costanzo. The name Bochum Welt is a combination of the German word for "world" (welt) and the name of a high-powered astral telescope.

Di Costanzo has released numerous records on established record labels. His first single for Aphex Twin's Rephlex label,  "Scharlach Eingang" (1994), published by Warner/Chappell Music, was sufficiently accomplished that the British music magazine NME ran an article claiming that Bochum Welt was another of Aphex Twin's myriad alter egos.

Di Costanzo's first album on Sony Music Japan, "Module 2 / Desktop Robotics" collecting his first recordings, was followed by a double CD Rephlex release Robotic Operating Buddy, nominated in 2009 as a top 15 electronica album by the British music magazine The Wire.

BMG UK signed him to a long term worldwide publishing deal in 2009.

Rephlex Records released his new full length in 2013, “Good Programs (To Be Coloured in Yellow)”, as well as a collaborative EP with Heinrich Muller aka Gerald Donald from the Detroit group DREXCIYA, nominated in 2013 by Fact (UK magazine) in the 50 greatest 10″ records of FACT’s lifetime. Both of the records were published worldwide by BMG.

"April", a 17 studio track album, is one of the official Record Store Day releases in April 2017, released by Studio K7 and published by BMG. 

In 2019 and 2020 "Seafire", an album and remixes released by CPU Records / BMG, includes collaborations with Nine Inch Nails former member Telefon Tel Aviv and EOD. 

In addition to releasing his own music, Di Costanzo has worked with Thomas Dolby's Headspace and Beatnik Inc., the Hollywood companies that completed multimedia productions for Steven Spielberg, David Bowie and others.

Discography

Albums
 R.O.B. (Robotic Operating Buddy) (2008)
 Good Programs (To Be Coloured In Yellow) (2013)
 April (2017)
 Seafire (2019)

EPs

 F-JX1 (1994; split EP with Xyrex)
 Scharlach Eingang (1994)
 Les Dances D' Été (1995)
 Phial (1995)
 Telestatt (1995)
 Module 2 (1996)
 Desktop Robotics (1997)
 Feelings On A Screen (1997)
 Program 11 (1998)
 Martians and Spaceships (1999)
 Fashion (2001)
 Eldar (2001; split EP with The Modernist)
 Quadscreen (2002; billed as Portamento feat. Bochum Welt)
 Kissing A Robot Goodbye (2004)
 Elan (2005)
 Robotic Operating Buddy (single)

Notes: the 3 tracks from the split ep are included on Scharlach Eingang.

These releases don't call themselves EPs but clock in at under 35 minutes.

References

External links 
 
 
 

Italian electronic musicians
Living people
Intelligent dance musicians
Year of birth missing (living people)